CCAAT/enhancer binding protein (C/EBP), epsilon, also known as CEBPE and CRP1, is a type of ccaat-enhancer-binding protein. CEBPE is its human gene and is pro-apoptotic.

The protein encoded by this gene is a bZIP transcription factor which can bind as a homodimer to certain DNA regulatory regions. It can also form heterodimers with the related protein CEBP-δ. The encoded protein may be essential for terminal differentiation and functional maturation of committed granulocyte progenitor cells. Mutations in this gene have been associated with specific granule deficiency, a rare congenital disorder. Multiple variants of this gene have been described, but the full-length nature of only one has been determined.

References

Further reading

External links 
 
 

Transcription factors